Reflection Bay Golf Club, located in Henderson, Nevada, United States is the first public resort golf course in Nevada personally designed by Jack Nicklaus and the host course to the nationally televised Wendy's 3-Tour Challenge benefiting the Dave Thomas Foundation for Adoption. The 7,261-yard, par-72 award-winning course makes its way through the desert while providing views of Lake Las Vegas. Sculpted from the terrain's natural contours, the course features three waterfalls and plays around arroyos and water. Five holes are located along one and a half miles of Lake Las Vegas' shoreline.

Additionally, Reflection Bay is home to The Golf Institute at Lake Las Vegas Resort that offers residents and guests golf school options and private instruction.

Reflection Bay Golf Club is the home course of PGA Tour pro Craig Barlow, as well as LPGA professional Natalie Gulbis.

References

External links

Golf clubs and courses in Nevada
Golf clubs and courses designed by Jack Nicklaus
Golf in Las Vegas
Sports in Henderson, Nevada
Organizations based in Henderson, Nevada
Buildings and structures in Henderson, Nevada